Navada may refer to:

 A misspelling of Nevada, a US state
 Arifpur Navada, Uttar Pradesh, India, a village
 Kalinga Navada (1958–1990), Indian singer

See also
 Nawada (disambiguation)
 Nevada (disambiguation)